Alfa Pendular is the name of the flagship Pendolino high-speed tilting train of Portuguese state railway company CP.

The trains were assembled in Portugal by ADtranz at the former Sorefame works at Amadora, based on contracting partnership between Fiat-Ferroviaria as the main contractor and ADtranz and Siemens as the main subcontractors.

Beginning 2017, the trains were refurbished, introducing new interiors, livery, seating and features such as Wi-Fi and power outlets.

Description 
The Alfa Pendular high speed train is a six car electric multiple unit (EMU), which is derived from and closely resembles the Giugiaro designed Italian Fiat-Ferroviaria ETR 480 Pendolino train. The bogies had to be redesigned to operate on Portugal's  track.

There are 8 traction motors, installed on all but the two middle vehicles of the train, developing .

Tilting technology 
Its tilting train technology, with a maximum tilt angle of 8°, allows the train to negotiate curves at higher speeds than conventional trains. The combination of the resulting high cornering velocity and the tilting movement of the carriages helps ensure a comfortable ride for the passengers, although the jostle and sway compensating for track irregularities may cause "travel sickness" in those susceptible.  The hydraulic tilting system is governed by two gyroscopes in the head cars. The curve is found on the base of the elevation of the external track.

The use of this train did not require particular modifications to the existing rail network, but it is expensive in terms of maintenance of the rolling stock because of the complexity of the tilting system.

Stations 
The stations served by the Alfa Pendular are from north to south:
Braga
Guimarães
Famalicão
Trofa
Porto-Campanhã
Vila Nova de Gaia
Espinho
Aveiro
Coimbra-B
Pombal
Entroncamento
Santarém
Lisboa–Oriente
Lisboa–Santa Apolónia (off the lines from/to Faro)
Lisboa-Entrecampos
Pinhal Novo

Albufeira
Loulé

See also 

 List of high speed trains

References

External links 

 

Pendolino
Tilting trains
High-speed rail in Portugal
Electric multiple units of Portugal
Fiat Ferroviaria
Siemens multiple units
Adtranz multiple units